Little Constantine is a legendary figure of Albanian folk poetry. In northern Albania he is also known as Aga Ymeri, in southern Albania as Ymer Ago, among the Italo-Albanians as Konstandini i Vogëlith (Little Constantine), and in Byzantine acritic songs as Κωσταντίνος ό μικρός, Konstantinos o Mikros (Little Constantine). This character reflects the theme of the reunification of husband and wife in Albanian folklore, as did Odysseus in ancient Greek mythology.

Background
The day after Aga Ymeri was married, he received the following order from the Sultan: "Aga Ymeri of Ulqin, you must depart immediately for war. The enemy has invaded..." Although this was unfortunate news, the warrior had to leave his wife and obey.

Konstantini i vogelith
Albanian mythology
Characters in Albanian epic poetry

See also
 The Twins (Albanian tale)

Sources

Citations

Bibliography

Albanian mythology
Characters in Albanian epic poetry